Bob Chitester (October 30, 1937 – May 8, 2021) was an American Television Executive and Producer, best known for creating the 10-hour, ten-part series starring economist Milton Friedman called Free to Choose.

Biography

Bob Chitester was born in 1937 in rural Pennsylvania, son of a lineman named Palmer R. Chitester. Chitester attended the University of Michigan for both his B.A. as well as M.A. degrees in Media, Radio and Television. Chitester created the first public television station in Erie, Pennsylvania in the late 1960s, and called it WQLN for "Question and Learn." In the mid-1970's, Chitester became interested in making a counter series to the program hosted by left-liberal economist John Kenneth Galbraith, which was called The Age of Uncertainty and first aired in 1977.

Chitester approached recent Nobel laureate economist Milton Friedman in 1977 about making a program of this type, and Friedman agreed, with filming beginning  and culminating in the production of a 10-hour show titled, Free to Choose which went on to be one of PBS's most watched programs. Free to Choose was accompanied by a best-selling book of 1980 of the same name.

In Chitester's later years, he went on to found the Free To Choose Network (FTCN), and created a high number of programs intended for public television distribution as well as release on platforms such as YouTube.

An article from The Wall Street Journal praised Chitester's work in creating Free to Choose, and in particular in launching economist Milton Friedman to stardom. The Wall Street Journal went further in stating that the influence that the Free to Choose program had on the Reagan administration was immense, as well as the effect the program had on the public-at-large by popularizing capitalism and free market ideas to millions of television viewers well in to the 1980s:

Chitester was known as a lone independent thinker in his beliefs as a General Manager of a Public Television station, "Mr. Chitester was probably the only PBS or NPR station manager who didn’t believe public radio and television should receive subsidies from American taxpayers."

At the age of 83, following a 7-year battle with cancer, Chitester died in Erie, Pennsylvania.

Awards

Bob received the Sir Antony Fisher Lifetime Achievement Award in 2016 from Atlas Network.

Filmography

 Free to Choose: Original 1980 10-hour, 10-part series starring Milton Friedman – Executive producer
 The Power of Choice: The Life and Ideas of Milton Friedman – 2007
 The Ultimate Resource – 2007
 The Power of the Poor – 2009
 Turmoil & Triumph: The George Shultz Years – 2010 – starring Secretary of State under Ronald Reagan, George Shultz
 Europe's Debt: America's Crisis? – 2012
 Free or Equal – 2015
 Testing Milton Friedman: Equality of Opportunity – 2012
 Globalization at the Crossroads – 2011
 Economic Freedom in Action: Changing Lives – 2013
 Walter Williams: Suffer No Fools – 2014
 Unlikely Heroes of the Arab Spring – 2013
 Power to the People – 2015
 India Awakes with Johan Norberg – 2015
 Trailblazers: The New Zealand Story – 2017
 The Real Adam Smith: Morality and Markets – 2016
 School Inc. Episode 1: The Price of Excellence – 2016
 Is America in Retreat? – 2017
 Work & Happiness: The Human Cost of Welfare – 2017
 The Price of Peace – 2018
 Sweden: Lessons for America? – 2018
 A More or Less Perfect Union Episode 1 - A Constitution In Writing – 2020
 Thomas Sowell: Common Sense in a Senseless World – 2020

See also
Thomas Skinner (television executive)

References

1937 births
2021 deaths
American television executives
American television producers
Public Broadcasting Service
Television producers from Pennsylvania
University of Michigan alumni